Devan a/l E. Kuppusamy, better known as K. Devan (born 12 April 1961) is a Malaysian football manager. He is the Head Coach of Malaysia Super League club Negeri Sembilan.

As a player
K. Devan born in Bahau, Negeri Sembilan is a former centre-back player of Negeri Sembilan FA from 1980s. Before that, he also played with PB Negeri Sembilan Indians in Malaysia FAM Cup and reached the final in 1980.

As a coach
K. Devan officially started his coaching career in 2004 with his former team Negeri Sembilan FA. He won the 2005-06 Malaysia Super League championship with Negeri Sembilan, as well as guiding the team to the 2006 Malaysia Cup final and 2006 Malaysia FA Cup semi-final.

He then coaches Malacca FA in 2007, and in 2008 coaches Kuala Muda Naza FC where he led the team to the Malaysia Premier League championship that year.

In 2009, he was signed as Selangor FA team manager and head coach. He held the roles until his resignation as head coach in September 2011. Under his guidance, Selangor FA became the Super League champion in 2009, 2010 and also won 2009 Malaysia FA Cup.

He was appointed as head coach of Johor FC for the 2012 Super League Malaysia season, however he resigned in April 2012 after series of poor results in the league.

In early 2013, Devan was appointed as head coach of Felda United FC but was replaced by Azuan Zain in June 2013, with Felda United in poor form and in danger of being relegated with only four games remaining. Devan later was named as the new head coach of Penang FA, a team newly promoted to 2014 Malaysia Premier League, in October 2013.

In November 2014, Negeri Sembilan announced that Devan will take over the Malaysia Premier League club for the 2015 season.

On 5 December 2015, Kelantan FA has unveiled K. Devan as their new head coach. After an unsatisfactory performance shown by the team in the league, he decided to resign on 10 May 2016 citing personal reasons. He was replaced as Kelantan FA head coach by Velizar Popov.

In December 2017, MISC-MIFA announced that Devan will take over the position as head coach of the Malaysia Premier League club for the 2018 season. Devan has already overseen the team as interim head coach when he was appointed as technical director in June 2017.

Coaching statistics

Honours

Managerial
NS Chempaka Fc
Malaysia Premier League (1):2000
Negeri Sembilan
Malaysia FA Cup        (1):2003
 Malaysia Super League (1): 2005-06
Malaysia Premier League (1): 2021

Kuala Muda
 Malaysia Premier League (1): 2007-08

Selangor
 Malaysia Super League (2): 2009, 2010
 Malaysia FA Cup (1): 2009
 Sultan Haji Ahmad Shah Cup (2): 2009, 2010

Individual
National Football Awards
Best Coach Award : 2005-06, 2009

References

External links
 K. Devan's profile
K.Devan Interview. Kelab e-Penyokong Bola Sepak N9. (N9FUTBOL.COM)

1961 births
Living people
People from Selangor
Malaysian people of Indian descent
Malaysian footballers
Association football central defenders
Negeri Sembilan FA players
Malaysian football managers